Welshpool and Llanfair Light Railway No. 1 The Earl and No. 2 Countess are narrow gauge steam locomotives. They were built by Beyer Peacock & Co. Ltd. at the Gorton Foundry, Manchester in 1902. They were delivered new to the Welshpool and Llanfair Light Railway in 1902, as No.1 The Earl and No.2 The Countess, where they continue to run today.

History

Original Operations

The  gauge Welshpool and Llanfair Light Railway was opened on 4 April 1903 to aid economic development in a remote area, never making a profit. It was originally operated by the Cambrian Railways, connecting with it at the former Oswestry and Newtown Railway station in the town of Welshpool. This meant that the engines had to be built to a compact and sturdy design capable of handling trains on the steep gradients.

The engines built to these specifications were No.1 The Earl and No.2 The Countess. They were both delivered new, to the Welshpool and Llanfair Light Railway.

The locomotives were named in honour of the Earl and Countess of Powys as the Earl did much to support the construction of the railway. In the Great Western era, The Countess had its name shortened to Countess.

The Earl and Countess ran the line from 1903 until closure of the railway in 1956. The engines were overhauled at Oswestry Works and were sent there on closure of the railway.

Preservation

By 1959, negotiations had begun with British Railways and the Welshpool and Llanfair Light Railway Preservation Company had leased the line from British Railways by the end of 1962. On 28 July 1961, The Earl returned after storage and overhaul at Oswestry Works, with Countess following not long after. They have continued to work on the line ever since.

Design
The two locomotives are almost identical  engines with side tanks and Walschaerts valve gear.

During their lifetime they have had many modifications, particularly after the takeover of the Great Western. During this period they were fitted with a larger cab, handles on the smokebox door, rather than the original wheel, a larger dome, a much larger and more sophisticated safety valve and two different funnels. They were painted in Great Western green.

When taken over by British Railways, their shunting bells and chopper couplings were removed, and were repainted black.

From 1997 to 2001, the locomotives were fully overhauled at Llanfair, which included the fitting of new boilers and cylinders.

They are currently the same design as the BR era, but have been worn different liveries in preservation. Currently, The Earl is BR condition and Countess in Great Western livery.

Welshpool and Llanfair Light Railway
Individual locomotives of Great Britain
Preserved narrow gauge steam locomotives of Great Britain
0-6-0T locomotives
Railway locomotives introduced in 1902
Beyer, Peacock locomotives
2 ft 6 in gauge locomotives